Jai Samaikyandhra Party (JSP; Telugu for "Long live United Andhra Party") was an Indian political party launched by former Chief Minister of Andhra Pradesh, Nallari Kiran Kumar Reddy. He launched the party in protest against Government of India's decision to bifurcate Andhra Pradesh through Andhra Pradesh Reorganisation Bill. Its poll plank is self-respect of  Telugu people. The party was formally launched at a public meeting in Rajahmundry on 12 March 2014, and promised rollback of Telangana state in the event of JSP winning 25 seats. Its electoral symbol is a pair of slippers. In elections the party failed to win a single seat and lost deposits in many seats. Finally the party dissolved on 13 July 2018 and Nallari Kiran Kumar Reddy re-joined INC.

History
After the bill was passed for the bifurcation of the state of Andhra Pradesh, Kiran Kumar Reddy resigned as Chief Minister and on 7 March 2014 announced that he would soon launch a political party. And on 11 March 2014, he launched a political party named as Jai Samaikyandhra Party, by opposing his own party. He started giving vocal support by organizing press conferences while he was still the CM in support of the Samaikyandhra Movement and its justification. The party dissolved on 13 July 2018 and Nallari Kiran Kumar Reddy re-joined INC.

Ideology
The party mission is to regain self-respect of Telugu people and will work towards the re-unification of Andhra Pradesh on the lines of Germany. And expects the demand to come from Telangana region, after grappling with post bifurcation problems like river waters, electricity, education, jobs, medical facilities.  It will take too much of time to develop a city like Hyderabad and create employment like in Hyderabad. Our manifesto is to open all the government industries like government diaries, sugar factories and abandoned industry is one of the main concept to open and create employment opportunities and develop the government sector in united Andhra Pradesh.

Prominent Members 
Nallari Kiran Kumar Reddy Former Chief Minister of Andhra Pradesh

References

Indian National Congress breakaway groups
Political parties established in 2014
Regionalist parties in India
2014 establishments in Andhra Pradesh